Buerat, or Buerat el Hussoun, is a village in western Libya, some  west of Sirte.

Notes

Populated places in Sirte District
Villages in Libya